First Cut may refer to:

 First Cut (UK TV series), a British series of documentaries
 First Cut (U.S. TV series), an American medical drama series on The CW Television Network, retitled Emily Owens, M.D.
 First Cut (album), 2000 album by Mai Kuraki
 The First Cut – The Immediate Anthology, 2001 album by P.P. Arnold
 Vacancy 2: The First Cut,  2008 American film
 Caedmon's Song, also known as The First Cut, 1990 novel by Peter Robinson 
 Neighboring Sounds (band), formerly known as The First Cut, an indie band from Bergen, Norway

See also 
 Rough cut, the first cut of a film
 First haircut